Rich McDonald (born 21 May 1949) is a Canadian hurdler. He competed in the men's 110 metres hurdles at the 1972 Summer Olympics.

References

1949 births
Living people
Athletes (track and field) at the 1970 British Commonwealth Games
Athletes (track and field) at the 1972 Summer Olympics
Canadian male hurdlers
Olympic track and field athletes of Canada
Place of birth missing (living people)
Commonwealth Games competitors for Canada